The 2005–06 Boston Celtics season was the 60th season of the Boston Celtics in the National Basketball Association (NBA).  This was the 56th and final season of Arnold "Red" Auerbach's official involvement with the team.  Auerbach (who continued to hold the title of team president) died shortly before the next season.

Draft picks

Roster

Regular season

Standings

Record vs. opponents

Transactions

Trades

Free agents

Additions

Subtractions

References

External links
2005–06 Boston Celtics season at Basketball Reference

See also
2005–06 NBA season

Boston Celtics seasons
Boston Celtics
Boston Celtics
Boston Celtics
Celtics
Celtics